The Kochrab Ashram was the first ashram in India organized by Mohandas Gandhi, the leader of the Indian independence movement, and was given to him by his friend, the barrister Jivanlal Desai. Founded on 25 May 1915, Gandhi's Kochrab Ashram was located near the city of Ahmedabad in the state of Gujarat. On 20 July, 1915 Gandhi and his followers formally took over this building.

This ashram was a major centre for students of Gandhian ideas to practise satyagraha, self-sufficiency, Swadeshi, work for the upliftment of the poor, women and untouchables, and to promote better public education and sanitation. The ashram was organised on a basis of human equality.

See also
 Tolstoy Farm
 Sabarmati Ashram
 Sevagram

References

Ashrams
1918 establishments in India
Mahatma Gandhi
Indian independence movement
Buildings and structures in Ahmedabad